Tlaxcala is a Mexican state.

Tlaxcala may also refer to:

 Tlaxcala (city), the capital city of the Mexican state of Tlaxcala and seat of the municipality
 Tlaxcala Municipality
 Tlaxcala Territory 1824–1857
 Tlaxcala (Nahua state), the pre-Columbian city and state

See also
 Tlaxcaltec, a Nahua people who live in the Mexican state of Tlaxcala
 San Esteban de Nueva Tlaxcala, a Tlaxcalan municipality in what is now the Mexican state of Coahuila